The 1995–96 season was Swindon Town's first season in the third tier since 1987. Alongside the Division Two league campaign, Swindon Town will also competed in the FA Cup, League Cup and the Auto Windscreen Trophy.

League One

Final league table

Result summary

Sponsors

Pre-season

Tour of Finland

Domestic friendlies

Division two

August

The F.A. Cup

F.A. Cup results

The League Cup

League Cup results

The Football League Trophy

Football League Trophy results

Matchday squads

League One line-ups 

1 1st Substitution, 2 2nd Substitution, 3 3rd Substitution.

F.A. Cup line-ups 

1 1st Substitution, 2 2nd Substitution, 3 3rd Substitution.

League Cup line-ups 

1 1st Substitution, 2 2nd Substitution, 3 3rd Substitution.

Football League Trophy line-ups 

1 1st Substitution, 2 2nd Substitution, 3 3rd Substitution.

Appearances and goals

|-
|}

Overall summary

Summary

Score overview

References

External links
Extensive Swindon Town statistics site

Swindon Town F.C. seasons
Swindon Town F.C.